Bonarua Hili Hili Island is a small island just north of Logea Island, in China Strait, Milne Bay Province, Papua New Guinea.

Administration 
The island belongs to Logea North Ward, which belongs to Bwanabwana Rural Local Level Government Area LLG, Samarai-Murua District, which are in Milne Bay Province.

Geography 
The island is part of the Logea group, itself a part of Samarai Islands of the Louisiade Archipelago.

References

Islands of Milne Bay Province
Louisiade Archipelago